The XIV International Chopin Piano Competition was held from 4 to 22 October 2000 in Warsaw. Li Yundi of China won the First Prize, becoming the first Chinese pianist to do so.

Awards 

The competition consisted of three stages and a final. After the previous two competitions had failed to produce a clear winner, the jury was once again inclined to not award first prize, though it did so in the end. 

The following prizes were awarded: 

In addition, three special prizes were awarded independently:

Jury 
The jury consisted of:
  Martha Argerich (joined during Stage II) ( VII)
  Edward Auer
  Paul Badura-Skoda
  Arnaldo Cohen
  Sequeira Costa
  Halina Czerny-Stefańska ( IV)
  
  Kazimierz Gierzod
  Lidia Grychtołówna
  Adam Harasiewicz ( V)
  Eugen Indjic
  Andrzej Jasiński  (chairman)
  Ivan Klánský
  Victor Merzhanov
  Germaine Mounier
  Hiroko Nakamura
  Piotr Paleczny (vice-chairman)
  
  Bernard Ringeissen (vice-chairman)
  Annerose Schmidt
  Regina Smendzianka
  
  Arie Vardi

References

Further reading

External links 
 

 

International Chopin Piano Competition
2000 in music
2000 in Poland
2000 in Polish music
2000s in Warsaw
October 2000 events in Europe